Independence Hall is a historic building in Philadelphia, Pennsylvania, United States.

Independence Hall can also refer to:
Independence Hall (Israel), in Tel Aviv, Israel
Independence Hall of Korea, a history museum in Cheonam, South Korea
Independence Commemoration Hall (Sri Lanka), in Colombo, Sri Lanka
West Virginia Independence Hall, Wheeling, West Virginia, United States

See also
 Palace of Independence (disambiguation)
 Independence Square (disambiguation)
 Independence Building, several structures
 Independence Centre (disambiguation)
 Independence Plaza (disambiguation)
 Independence Mall (disambiguation)
 Independence (disambiguation)

Architectural disambiguation pages